The Diocese of Tanga may refer to;

Anglican Diocese of Tanga, in Tanzania
Roman Catholic Diocese of Tanga, in Tanzania